The U.S. state of New Hampshire first required its residents to register their motor vehicles and display license plates in 1905. , plates are issued by the New Hampshire Department of Safety through its Division of Motor Vehicles. Front and rear plates are required for most classes of vehicles, while only rear plates are required for motorcycles and trailers.

Passenger baseplates

1905 to 1972
The 1955 (dated 1956) issue was the first New Hampshire license plate that complied with these standards.

1973 to present
In 1977, the U.S. Supreme Court ruled that vehicle owners may cover up the mottos that a state places on its license plates. The case began in 1974 when George Maynard, a Jehovah's Witness from Claremont, New Hampshire, and his wife taped over the "Live Free or Die" motto on their plates. Maynard, who argued that the motto violated his religious beliefs, subsequently spent 15 days in jail for refusing to pay the $75 fine imposed for covering up the motto. Justice Burger stated, "The First Amendment protects the right of individuals to hold a point of view different from the majority and to refuse to foster, in the way New Hampshire commands, an idea they find morally objectionable."

County coding

From 1949 to 1979, passenger plates in New Hampshire featured a two-letter code indicating the county in which the vehicle was registered, as follows:

County code allocations

Alphabetical cross-reference

In addition, XA–XN were used on interim plates issued to new registrants between December 1977 and December 1978, while the serial AC 000 was and still is used on sample plates.

Non-passenger plates

Gallery

References

External links
New Hampshire license plates, 1969–present

New Hampshire
Transportation in New Hampshire
1905 introductions
1905 in transport
New Hampshire transportation-related lists